Badminton events have been contested at every Asian Para Games since 2010 Asian Games in Guangzhou.

Editions

Medal table

See also 
 Badminton at the Summer Paralympics
 Badminton at the Asian Games

References

External links 
Asian Paralympic Committee

 
Sports at the Asian Para Games
Asian Para Games